

Cinema and theatre 
Film directors

 Abhinay Deo – film director
 Amol Palekar – Bollywood director & actor, received award for best actor of 1979 for film "Gol Maal"
 Amol Gupte – Bollywood director & actor, received award for best screen play for film "Taare Zameen Par"
 Anand Patwardhan – documentary filmmaker, known for his activism through social action documentaries on topics such as corruption, slum dwellers, etc.
 Ashutosh Gowarikar – director of Lagaan (nominated for Oscars, has bagged 5 filmfare, 7 international awards)
 Baburao Mistry – Wrote his own screenplays; first Indian filmmaker to adopt the method of "Stenographic", the method Satyajit Ray adopted for Pather Panchali
 Bhagwan Dada – film director, producer and actor
 Bhalji Pendharkar – director, was associated with Prabhat Film Company, also received Dadasahab Phalke Award
 Dadasaheb Phalke – directed the first Indian feature film, the "father of Indian cinema"; directed 95 movies and 26 short films in a span of 19 years
 Dadasaheb Torne- made first Indian film named Shree Pundlik in the year 1912
 Deepak Kadam – Director of various Video Albums, Ad films, TV serials & Marathi Feature Films. His upcoming movie WAAKYA has been chosen from 280 films from 35 country for navi Mumbai international film festival-2014
 Dinkar D patil – had an illustrious career as a filmmaker for almost five decades; introduced Marathi Lavani folk dance in his films
 Gauri Shinde – Bollywood director; made her directional debut through the highly acclaimed English Vinglish
 Jabbar Patel – director, maker of classics films in Marathi, received Nargis Dutt award for best feature film on national integration
 Kavita Lad - Marathi television and theatre actress 
 Kunal Deshmukh – Bollywood director
 Madhur Bhandarkar – Bollywood director, Script Writer, producer, also 3 times recipient of national filmfare award for best director
 Mahesh Kothare – Bollywood director
 Mahesh Manjrekar – Bollywood director, actor, screenwriter, producer, has won 2 star awards & 1 national award
 Master Vinayak – Bollywood director

 N. Chandra (Chandrakant Narvekar) – Bollywood director
 Nishikant Kamat – director of movies like Dombivli Fast, Mumbai Meri Jaan and Drishyam
 Paresh Mokashi – his film Harishchandrachi Factory was the Academy Award for Best Foreign Language Film official entry to 82nd Academy Awards in the Best Foreign Language Film
 Acharya Atre – his Marathi film, Shyamchi Aai (श्यामची आई) won the 1954 National Film Award for Best Feature Film, received the First National Film Award
 Prasad Oak – Marathi actor, film director, film producer, poet, singer, writer, singer
 Raja Nawathe-Bollywood director, Regarded as one of the finest female actors in the history of Hindi cinema,
 Raja Paranjpe – Had a career spanning over 40 years, also was associated with about 80 Marathi film and Hindi film
 Sachin Pilgaonkar – Actor and director, started acting in films at the age of 4, directed several films & TV Soaps
 Sachin Kundalkar – Bollywood director, is a Marathi film director and screenplay writer, received the Best Screenplay for his film Gandha in 2009
 Sai Paranjpe – Director, scriptwriter & theatre personality, received Padma Bhushan in 2006
 Umesh Vinayak Kulkarni – Famous director of acclaimed Marathi films like Deool, Vihir and Valu
 V Shantaram – Bollywood director, He directed his first film, "Netaji Palkar" in 1927. In 1929, he founded the Prabhat Film Company
 Vishnupant Damle – Was a set designer, film director of Marathi Cinema, was also one of the co-founders for Prabhat Film Company
 Vishram Sawant – Bollywood director

Film actresses
 Aditi Sarangdhar – Marathi actor known as Angry Young Woman
 Amruta Khanvilkar – Marathi actress and dancer who also appeared in Bollywood films
 Antara Mali – Bollywood actress
 Ashwini Bhave – Bollywood actress
 Bhagyashree Patwardhan – Bollywood actress, known for Maine Pyaar Kiya (1989)
 Bhargavi Chirmule – Marathi actress; worked in movies like Kass and One room kitchen
 Durga Khote – actress; marks the pioneering phase for women in Indian cinema; India Today named her among "100 people who shaped India"
 Durgabai Kamat (1899–1997), first actress of Indian cinema, in Mohini Bhasmasur (1913), second movie of Phalke 
 Gauri Pradhan Tejwani – television actress
 Jayshree Gadkar – acted in several Marathi films, also acted in Ramanand Sagar's TV Series Ramayana as Kaushalya, mother of Rama
 Kajal Kiran - Bollywood actress of 70s
 Kavita Lad - Actress
 Kimi Katkar – Bollywood Actress
 Kishori Shahane – Film and television actress
 Lalita Pawar-Noted actress in Indian cinema
 Leela Chitnis – First Indian Film Star to endorse popular soap brand "LUX", concession then only granted to top Hollywood heroines
 Madhuri Dixit – Leading actress in Indian cinema in the 90s, Forbes named her among "Top 5 most powerful Indian Movie Stars"
 Mamta Kulkarni – Bollywood Actress
 Manjari Phadnis – Actress
 Mayuri Kango – Bollywood actress
 Mrinal Kulkarni – Model & Actress
 Mugdha Godse – Model & Actress
 Namrata Shirodkar – Bollywood Actress
 Nanda – actress
 Nivedita Joshi – Actress
 Nutan – Bollywood Actress (Tanuja's elder sister and shobhana samarth's daughter), role model for many Bollywood Heroines, received Padma Shri in 1974
 Padmini Kolhapure – Bollywood actress
 Pallavi Joshi – Bollywood actress
 Prarthana Behere – Television and film actress
 Priya Bapat- Leading Marathi Actress
 Priya Tendulkar – Bollywood Actress, Social Activist, her father was eminent popular writer Vijay Tendulkar
 Radhika Apte – actress
 Ranjana Deshmukh – popular Marathi actress
 Reema Lagoo – acted in various Marathi dramas, Marathi movies, and Bollywood
 Renuka Shahane – Bollywood actress
 Sulochana – actress, received the "Dadasaheb Phalke Award" in 1973
 Sagarika Ghatge – actress
 Sai Tamhankar – Marathi actress
 Sandhya – appeared in popular films like Navrang, Do Aankhen Barah Haath and Jhanak Jhanak Payal Baaje
 Sarika – actress, worked in more than 50 Hindi films, married to Kamal Hasan (Tamil superstar)
 Shakuntala Paranjpye – actress
 Shashikala Jawalkar – Bollywood actress who performed character roles in the 60s and 70s
 Shilpa Shirodkar – Bollywood actress
 Shilpa Tulaskar – Television actress
 Shobhana Samarth – actress and mother of Nutan and Tanuja
 Shraddha Kapoor – Bollywood actress
 Smita Patil – Bollywood actress nominated for several Filmfare and national awards, received Padma Shri in 1985
 Sonali Bendre – Bollywood actress; acted in Hindi, Marathi, Tamil, Telugu, and Kannada films; received star screen best actress award in 2004
 Sonali Kulkarni – Bollywood actress
 Sonalee Kulkarni – Marathi actress
 Supriya Pilgaonkar – actress
 Tanuja – Bollywood actress
 Tejashri Pradhan – Marathi and Bollywood actress
 Urmila Matondkar – Bollywood actress, started acting from the age of 9 and has acted in several Hindi, Telugu films
 Vandana Gupte – stage and television actress
 Varsha Usgaonkar – Bollywood actress
 Vidya Malvade - Bollywood actress
 Zeenat Aman – Bollywood actress

Beauty queens and supermodels
 Aditi Govitrikar – model
 Anusha Dandekar- MTV VJ and model
 Madhu Sapre – former supermodel
 Mugdha Godse – Bollywood actress
 Pooja Chitgopekar- Miss India Earth 2007 and later Miss Earth Air 2007
 Rakhi Sawant – model and actress
 Ujjwala Raut – international ramp model

Film actors

 Ajinkya Dev – Bollywood actor
 Ashok Saraf – leading Marathi actor
 Atul Kulkarni – Bollywood actor; theatre artist; acted in several Marathi, Hindi, and Kannada films; nominated for Asia Pacific Screen Award for Best Actor for Marathi film Natarang
 Bhanu Athaiya – costume designer, recipient of Oscar for her work on the movie Gandhi
 Bharat Jadhav – leading Marathi theatre performer
 Dada Kondke – revolutionised Marathi comedy
 David Abraham Cheulkar – Jewish Bollywood character actor of the 60s
 Dilip Prabhavalkar – leading stage artist. Last seen as Gandhi in Lage Raho Munnabhai
 Kanan Kaushal
 Kashinath Ghanekar - veteran stage actor
 Kuldeep Pawar – actor
 Laxmikant Berde – leading Marathi actor of 80s and 90s
 Milind Soman – model and actor
 Mohan Agashe – leading art film and Bollywood actor
 Mohan Gokhale (1953–1999) – Mr. Yogi 

 Nana Patekar – Bollywood and leading stage actor
 Omi Vaidya – Bollywood actor
 Rajnikant – Tamil/South Indian cinema superstar and second highest paid Asian actor as of 2017
 Ramesh Bhatkar – actor
 Rakesh Bapat  – Bollywood actor, also holds the title of Grasim Mr. India
 Ritesh Deshmukh – Bollywood actor
 Sachin Pilgaonkar - film and television actor, director, singer and producer. Winner of four Filmfare Awards
 Sachin Khedekar – Bollywood actor movies Subhas Chandra Bose, Astitva
 Sadashiv Amrapurkar – Bollywood and Marathi film actor
 Sanjay Narvekar- Marathi and Bollywood actor
 Sayaji Shinde – Marathi, Bollywood, Tollywood actor & film producer
 Shivaji Satam – actor
 Shreyas Talpade – Bollywood actor
 Shriram Lagoo - Marathi and Bollywood actor
 Sudhir Joshi – late Marathi actor, acted in several Marathi films
 Swanand Kirkire – Bollywood lyricist
 Vijayendra Ghatge – Bollywood actor
 Viju Khote – Bollywood actor
 Vikram Gokhale – actor

Indian classical musicians 

 Ajay Pohankar – classical vocalist
 Ajay–Atul – music composer brothers (Natrang)
 Arati Ankalikar-Tikekar – classical singer
 Arun Paudwal – music director of Marathi cinema
 Ashwini Bhide – classical Vocalist
 Bal Gandharva (1888–1967) singer and stage actor
 Bhimsen Joshi (1922–2011) - Indian vocalist in the Hindustani classical tradition, recipient of the Bharat Ratna

 C. R. Vyas (1924–2002)- Indian vocalist in the Hindustani classical tradition, recipient of the Padma Bhushan
 C. Ramchandra (or Ramchandra Chitalkar) (1918–1977) – Hindi film music director
 Datta Naik – Hindi film music director
 Hirabai Barodekar (1905–1989) – Indian Hindustāni classical music singer, pioneer of concerts by women artists in India, from the Kirana Gharana
 Hridaynath Mangeshkar – music director
 Jyotsna Bhole – singer, actor
 Kesarbai Kerkar – singer, born at Keri in Goa
 Kishori Amonkar (born 1931) – classical singer
 Laxmikant Kudalkar (1937–1998) – of the duo Laxmikant-Pyarelal
 Mogubai Kurdikar – singer from Jaipur Gharana born at Kurdi Goa.
 Prabha Atre (born 1932) - Indian classical vocalist; awarded Padmabhushan, Sangeet Natak Akademi award
 Ram Kadam (1916–1997) – Marathi music composer (Pinjra 1972, Sangte Aika 1959)
 Sameep Kulkarni - Sitarist
 Sanjeev Abhyankar – classical singer
 Satish Vyas – Santoor player, recipient of the Padma Shri
 Shrikrishna Narayan Ratanjankar (1899–1974) – Indian classical musicologist, Vocalist, composer, Padmabhushan 1957
 Shrinivas Khale - music director
 Shruti Sadolikar-Katkar
 Sudhir Phadke (1919–2002) – Marathi music composer, composed music for Geet Ramayan
 Sureshbabu Mane – vocalist of Kirana gharana
 Uday Bhawalkar – Dhrupad vocalist
 Ulhas Kashalkar – Hindustani Classical Vocalist
 V. G. Jog – violinist
 Vasant Desai – music director of Hindi/Marathi films
 Vasantrao Deshpande – classical singer
 Veena Sahasrabuddhe – classical vocalist
 Vidyadhar Oke - harmonium player, musicologist, musical instrument inventor
 Vishnu Digambar Paluskar – singer of gwalior gharana, reformer of Indian Classical Music
 Vishnu Narayan Bhatkhande (10 August 1860 – 19 September 1936) – Indian classical musicologist and reformer

Singers 
 Aarya Ambekar – singer
 Abhijeet Sawant – singer
 Anupama Deshpande – playback singer
 Anuradha Paudwal - singer
 Arun Date – singer
 Asha Bhosle – playback singer
 Bela Shende – playback singer
 Devaki Pandit – singer
 Hema Sardesai- Bollywood playback singer
 Hridaynath Mangeshkar – playback singer, was awarded Padmashri by Government of India in 2009
 Kaushal Inamdar – music composer, director
 Lata Mangeshkar – one of the most prominent female playback artists of Indian cinema; music composer; first Indian singer to enter the Guinness Book of World Records for having made most recordings in the world (1974–1991)

 Manik Varma – Classical singer, awarded Padma Shri in 1974
 Meena Mangeshkar – playback singer
 Milind Ingle – Marathi and Hindi music composer and singer
 Nihira Joshi – singer
 Prajakta Shukre – singer
 Rahul Vaidya – singer
 Sadhana Sargam – Bollywood playback singer
 Sandeep Khare – poet and singer
 Saleel Kulkarni - singer, musician, author, director
 Sanjivani - singer
 Shalmali Kholgade – singer
 Shridhar Phadke – Marathi music composer and singer, son of Sudhir Phadke
 Sudesh Bhosle - Bollywood playback singer
 Sudhir Phadke (25 July 1919, Kolhapur – 29 July 2002) – Marathi music composer and singer
 Suresh Wadkar – playback singer
 Usha Mangeshkar – singer
 Vaishali Samant – singer

Modern music 
 Avdhoot Gupte – music composer, singer
 Gaurav Dagaonkar – music composer, also does pock, Pop, as music director his first release Lanka
 Karsh Kale – New Age musician, fusion, electronica from US
 Milind Date – flautist, composer, Known for his collaborations with many international artists and flamboyant performances
 Salil Kulkarni – music composer, singer (Aggobai Dhaggobai)
 Sandip Khare – poet, songwriter and singer (Ayushyawar bolu kahi, Diwas Ase Ki)

Applied arts - fashion, photography, art direction, advertisement 
 Atul Kasbekar – first Indian to win the International Food and Beverage Creative Excellence Awards (FAB Awards) 2005, held at London
 Bhanu Athaiya – first Indian to win the Academy Award for Costume Design for the film Gandhi  (1982)
 Gautam Rajadhyaksha – one of India's leading fashion photographers
 Gopi Kukde – advertising veteran, prominently recognised for the advertising character of the Onida Devil

 M.V. Dhurandhar – painter and postcard artist
 Nitin Chandrakant Desai – art director, first Indian to receive the Genie Award for his film Such a Long Journey
 Pralhad Anant Dhond – later a teacher; in 1958 became the Dean of Sir. J. J. School of Art
 Ram V. Sutar – sculptor; his first work of note was the 45 feet Chambal monument at the Gandhi Sagar Dam, in Madhya Pradesh; received Padmashri in 1999
 Sambhaji Kadam – painter; also studied musicology, especially the "Shruti" intervals or the micro-tonic intervals in Indian music
 V. S. Gaitonde – painter, received First prize at the Young Asian Artists Exhibition, Rockefeller Fellowship and Padma Shri in 1971

Historians 
 Anant Sadashiv Altekar – in 1947, elected the First Chairman of the Numismatic Society of India
 Annabhau Sathe –a founder member of the Lal Bawta Kalapathak of the Communist Party in Maharashtra; people conferred the epithet Lok Shahir
 Babasaheb Purandare – historian who researched Shivajij
 Devadatta Ramakrishna Bhandarkar - archaeologist and epigraphist; Carmichael Professor of Ancient Indian History and Culture in the University of Calcutta
 Dattatraya Ganesh Godse – historian, playwright, art critic; received a Sangeet Natak Akademi Award in 1988
 Datto Vaman Potdar – due to vast knowledge he was called as Dr. Johnson of Maharashtra or a living encyclopaedia; the Government of India honoured Potdar with the title Mahamahopadhyaya (महामहोपाध्याय) in 1946, and Padma bhushan in 1967
 Govind Sakharam Sardesai – historian and writer
 Ninad Bedekar – historian and writer

 Shridhar Venkatesh Ketkar – His doctoral thesis was later published as The History of Caste in India (volume 1), which determines the date of Manusmriti
 Tryambak Shankar Shejwalkar, was the first historian to study the Third Battle of Panipat
 Vasudev Vishnu Mirashi – For his vital contribution to the Indian history he was honoured with the title Mahamahopadhyaya (महामहोपाध्याय) by the British Indian Government in 1941. He was also awarded Padmabhushan in 1975 by the President of India.
 Vishnushastri Krushnashastri Chiplunkar – His articles introduced reader to "Western" tradition of literacy criticism
 Vishwanath Kashinath Rajwade – He was considered to be the first in real sense to undertake an immense research of Maratha history
 Vishwas Patil – "Panipatkar", recipient of Bhartiya Parishad Award, Gadkari Award & several other prestigious awards
 Vithal Krishnaji Khedkar – Was one of the founders of Prarthana Samaj in Bombay & original author of a book later published The Divine Heritage of the Yadavas

Others 
 Vishnupant Moreshwar Chatre - Father of Indian circus
 Y. K. Padhye - Founder of modern-day ventriloquism in India

See also 
 List of Marathi people in science, engineering and technology
 List of Marathi Social reformers
 List of Marathi People in literature and journalism
 List of Marathi People in sports

References 

Lists of Marathi people